Hill Island is a Baffin Island offshore island located in the Arctic Archipelago in the territory of Nunavut. Bishop Island and Faris Island are in the immediate vicinity.

References 

Uninhabited islands of Qikiqtaaluk Region
Islands of Frobisher Bay